Drip Season 3 is the third mixtape from American rapper Gunna. It was released on February 2, 2018, by his record label, YSL Records. The album features guest appearances from Hoodrich Pablo Juan, Lil Durk, Nav, Metro Boomin, and Lil Yachty. It also features production by Nav, Metro Boomin, Wheezy, Turbo, Kacey Khaliel, Richie Souf and London on da Track, among others. This tape serves as the third installment of his Drip Season series. The deluxe edition was released simultaneously with the regular version, with three extra tracks, featuring guest appearances from Lil Uzi Vert, fellow labelmates Young Jordan and Young Thug, and Lil Baby. The mixtape was supported by one single: "Almighty" featuring Hoodrich Pablo Juan.

A sequel was released on January 7, 2022.

Background
Gunna explained the background of the mixtape, by stating;

On November 30, 2017, the EP Drip or Drown was released as a prelude to the mixtape.

Singles
On January 17, 2018, the mixtape's lead single "Almighty" featuring Hoodrich Pablo Juan was released. The Nasser Boulaich-directed music video was released on January 26, 2018.

Track listing
Credits adapted from BMI.

Charts

Weekly charts

Year-end charts

References

2018 mixtape albums
Albums produced by Metro Boomin
Albums produced by Nav (rapper)
Gunna (rapper) albums
Sequel albums
Albums produced by London on da Track